DBS may refer to:

Music groups
The dB's, a power pop band of the '70s and '80s
d.b.s., a Canadian punk rock band from 1992 to 2001
Death by Stereo, an American heavy metal/punk rock group from California

Companies and organizations

Schools
Diocesan Boys' School, a boys-only Direct Subsidy Scheme secondary school in Hong Kong
Don Bosco School, Manila, a private elementary and high school in Manila, Philippines
Dubai British School, a British international school in Dubai, United Arab Emirates
Dublin Business School, a private business college in Dublin, Ireland
Durham Business School, the business school of Durham University, UK

Other entities
DB Schenker, the trading name of DB Cargo UK 
DBS Bank, a Singaporean multinational bank
DBS Radio, the on-air name of the Dominica Broadcasting Corporation
Disclosure and Barring Service, United Kingdom public body
Den Beste Sykkel, a Norwegian bicycle brand and manufacturer

Science
Deep brain stimulation, a surgical treatment for some movement disorders
Dibutyl sebacate, an organic chemical
Dried blood spot testing, a form of bioanalysis

Technology
Database system
Discbox Slider, a carton board disc case
Dealer Business System, a supply chain management application for Caterpillar's dealers
Digital Book System, an early e-book reader from 1989
Direct broadcast satellite, satellite television broadcasts intended for home reception
Aston Martin DBS, 1967–72 automobile model
Aston Martin DBS V12, 2007–2012 automobile model, officially also called the Aston Martin DBS
Aston Martin DBS Superleggera, 2018- automobile model

Other uses
Doctor of Biblical Studies, an academic degree in applied theology
Dragon Ball Super, a 2015 manga and anime series
Double Barrel Shotgun, A shotgun with two parallel barrels

See also